Maria João Rodrigues GOIH is a Portuguese academic and politician who served as Member of the European Parliament and Vice-President of the Group of the Socialists and Democrats (S&D) from 2014 until 2019. Since 2017 she is also President of the Foundation for European Progressive Studies (FEPS), succeeding Italian politician Massimo d'Alema.

Her political career began as Minister of Employment of Portugal in the first government of Prime Minister António Guterres (1995–1997) and she was policy maker working in several posts in the European Institutions since 2000, notably in the leading teams of EU Council Presidencies. She is an expert on EU political economy and has notably served as Special Advisor to a number of elected representatives at both Portuguese and EU level, in particular to former Prime Minister António Guterres, the current Secretary General of United Nations, to several European Commissioners and to the former President of the Party of European Socialists (Poul Nyrup Rasmussen).

She is known as the "mother of the Lisbon Strategy" since this is one of her main outcomes. She had also a prominent roles in the development of: the EU2020 Strategy (the follow up of the Lisbon Strategy for Growth and Jobs); the EU Declaration on Globalization adopted by the European Council (2007); strategic partnerships with USA, China, India, Russia, South Africa and Brazil (2007-2012); the new phase of the Erasmus Programme (2008); the priorities for the European regional development policy (2005–07); the responses to the Euro-zone crisis (2008–13); the EP Strategic Resolutions on the European Commission Annual Work Programme (2015-2017); and, more recently, the European Pillar of Social Rights (2017).

In 2014, Rodrigues was elected Member of the European Parliament, integrating the Group of the Progressive Alliance of Socialists and Democrats (S&D) - the second most important EP Group, with 190 members coming from the 28 Member States -, which elected her in 2014 as Vice-president. As S&D Vice-President, she is in charge of general coordination and interface with the other EU institutions and member of the Committees of Employment and Social Affairs (EMPL) and Economic and Monetary Affairs (ECON).

In academic terms, Rodrigues was professor of European economic policies in the European Studies Institute – Université libre de Bruxelles and in the University Institute of Lisbon (ISCTE). She was also the chair of the European Commission Advisory Board for socio-economic sciences. She is author of more than one hundred publications, notably the books.

One month before the European Elections, she was left off the PS election list as she was found guilty of psychological harassment of one of her assistants.

Education
Rodrigues holds three master's degrees and a PhD in economics from the University of Paris 1 Pantheon-Sorbonne as well as a Degree in Sociology from the University Institute of Lisbon.

Political career

Career in national politics
A Professor of Economics at the University Institute of Lisbon (ISCTE-IUL) since 1987, Maria João Rodrigues started her career in public affairs in 1993 as a consultant in the Ministry of Employment and Social Security, then headed by José Falcão e Cunha in the conservative government of Prime Minister Aníbal Cavaco Silva. Following the victory of the Socialist Party in the 1995 general elections, she was appointed Minister for Employment and Training by Prime Minister António Guterres, on 28 October 1995. She attained a strategic agreement with social partners to prepare Portugal membership to the Eurozone(1997), completed a major reform in the management of the European Social Fund and held this office until 25 November 1997.

The Lisbon Strategy

After her role of Minister of Employment, Rodrigues was appointed by Prime Minister António Guterres special advisor and Head of the Prime Minister's Forward Studies Unit in 1998. In this capacity, she played a dramatic role during the Portuguese Presidency of the European Union, in the first semester of 2000. The Portuguese Presidency notably succeeded in securing a compromise on the so-called Lisbon Strategy, a comprehensive plan that was aimed at boosting growth, competitiveness and employment level in the EU building on innovation. The strategy was adopted at an extraordinary European Council meeting in Lisbon in March 2000, a meeting in which Maria João Rodrigues acted as a sherpa for the Prime Minister. She notably contributed to build a compromise between the delegations of the British and French governments, by resorting to the open method of coordination. Maria João Rodrigues continued to monitor closely the developments of the Lisbon Strategy, in particular as Special Advisor to the Luxembourg Presidency of the European Union for the Mid-term Review of the Lisbon Strategy (2005) and special advisor to the European Commission and Jean-Claude Juncker on the Lisbon strategy.

Looking back on this experience in 2010, Rodrigues wrote "Even if there were clear failures, the implementation of the Lisbon strategy should not be considered a failure.".  In 2007, the EU average GR was 2.7% and 16 million jobs have been created. Most of all, it changed the governance of the European Union with higher coordination of economic and social policies, involving around 400 measures.

In 2007, Rodrigues was appointed by Prime Minister José Socrates as special advisor for the European Union Council Presidency dealing with the Lisbon Treaty, the Lisbon strategy and EU Summits with international partners China, India, Brazil, Russia and Africa. This mission, which achieved the negotiation of the Lisbon Treaty, came to end on 1 January 2008, when the rotating presidency of the European Union was handed to Slovenia. Rodrigues has also started a process of "Dialogues for Sustainable Development" with these international partners, sponsored by Gulbenkian Foundation.

In 2010, the Lisbon Strategy was succeeded by the Europe 2020 strategy, a new EU plan for "smart, sustainable and inclusive economic growth". Although not acting in any official capacity anymore, Rodrigues' previous experiences with the Lisbon strategy meant that her viewpoint on the Europe 2020 was highly valued all across the political spectrum and in many European capitals.

Member of the European Parliament, 2014–2019
In the 2014 European elections, Rodrigues became a Member of the European Parliament and Vice-President of Progressive Alliance of Socialists and Democrats group, the second most important parliamentary group, along with other nine MEPs. . She also joined the Committee on Employment and Social Affairs.

In December 2015 Rodrigues was one of the candidates for the Portuguese Council of State (an advisory council to the President of the Republic) in the list put forward by the left-wing parties in the Portuguese parliament, as substitute member.

Also in 2015, Rodrigues led the S&D Group in the European Parliament to adopt detailed positions on the Greek government-debt crisis and on the reform of the Economic and Monetary Union of the European Union.

Psychological harassment case

On Thursday April 18, 2019, Maria Joao Rodrigues was found guilty by the European Parliament of psychological harassment of one of her employees.
 Among the nine separate allegations against Rodrigues were attempts to reduce working hours and salary of a staff member after maternity leave, asking an employee on sick leave to carry out late-night tasks and demanding staff work well beyond normal office hours. During the investigation, she was left off the Portuguese PS electoral list.

Political positions
Rodrigues has also been developing a policy response to the Eurozone crisis, notably with respect to the European Financial Stability Facility and the economic governance of the European Union. In October 2010, she published in European current affairs online newspaper EurActiv a "short theatre piece" summing up her thoughts on the issue of European Economic Governance, and several other policy papers, reports and books followed. In December 2011, Rodrigues argued for the use of a "big bazooka" to address the eurozone crisis, in the form of a large scale government debt purchase by the European Central Bank.

Main outcomes in EU policy-making
 The EU “Lisbon Strategy” for Growth and Jobs – with new policy orientations for industrial, information society, research, innovation, education, employment, social protection and environment policies (2000-2010). The follow-up with the EU2020 strategy 
 The EU Lisbon Treaty, final negotiation team (2007) 
 The EU Declaration on Globalization adopted by the European Council (2007) 
 Preparation of the EU Summits with EU strategic partners: USA, China, India, Russia, South Africa and Brazil (2007-2012) 
 The new phase of the Erasmus Programme (2008) 
 The priorities for the European regional development policy (2005–07) 
 The responses to the Euro-zone crisis (2008–13) 
 The European Pillar of Social Rights (2017) 
 EP Strategic Resolutions on the European Commission Annual Work Programme (2015-2017)

Main academic roles
 Professor of European Economic Policies at the Institute for European Studies, Université Libre de Bruxelles 
 Professor of Economics at the Lisbon University Institute (ISCTE-IUL), currently on leave due to public interest activity 
 President of the European Commission Advisory Board in charge of preparing the 7th Framework Programme for Research in socio-economic sciences 
 Economic rapporteur in the ESPAS, European Strategic Planning and Analysis System 
 Coordinator of the Project “Dialogues for Sustainable Development” bridging between the EU and Brazil, Russia, India and China, Calouste Gulbenkian Foundation 
 Member of the OECD network of government long-term strategists 
 Special Advisor to the Prime Minister and Head of the PM’s Forward Studies Unit

Other activities
 Reimagine Europa, Member of the Advisory Board
 Foundation for European Progressive Studies (FEPS), President (since 2017)
 Jacques Delors Institute, Member of the Governing Board
 European Policy Centre (EPC), Member of the Strategic Council
 New Pact for Europe, Member of the Advisory Group (since 2012)

Recognition

Awards
 Nominated for the Gaetan Pirou Award (Economic Science Award given by French universities at national level), 1986.
 Gulbenkian Science and Technology National Award in Portugal, 1986 for her PhD thesis on the Employment System
 Highly mentioned in the Boa Esperança Science and Technology Award in Portugal, 1992

National honors
 Commander of the Order of the Oak Crown, Grand-Duchy of Luxembourg, for her contribution to the promotion of social Europe, 2000.
 Grand Officer of the Order of Prince Henry, Portuguese Republic, for her academic and public service functions and for her European contribution, 2003.
 Knight of Légion d’Honneur, French Republic, for her role in the European integration and the EU Lisbon Strategy for Growth and Jobs, 2005. 
 Officier of Légion d’Honneur (promotion within the Order's ranks), French Republic, for her role in the EU Presidency and the Lisbon Treaty, 2008.

External links
  
 
Twitter
Facebook

References

1955 births
Living people
20th-century Portuguese politicians
20th-century Portuguese women politicians
21st-century Portuguese politicians
Government ministers of Portugal
Members of the Forward Studies Unit of the European Commission
MEPs for Portugal 2014–2019
21st-century women MEPs for Portugal
21st-century Portuguese economists
Portuguese women economists
Portuguese women academics
University of Lisbon alumni
Academic staff of the University of Lisbon
University of Paris alumni
Women government ministers of Portugal
20th-century Portuguese economists